The Treasurer of the Ordnance was a subordinate of the Master-General of the Ordnance in the United Kingdom, the office being created in 1670. The office was abolished in 1836 and its duties merged with that of several others to form the office of Paymaster-General.

Treasurers of the Ordnance
25 November 1670: Sir George Wharton, Bt
12 August 1681: Charles Bertie
8 June 1699: Harry Mordaunt
16 June 1702: Charles Bertie
28 May 1705: Harry Mordaunt
30 June 1712: Charles Eversfield
2 December 1714: Harry Mordaunt
21 May 1720: John Plumptre
31 December 1751: Francis Gashry
10 June 1762: Charles Jenkinson
10 May 1763: John Ross Mackye
28 November 1780: William Adam
27 May 1782: William Smith
10 May 1783: William Adam
12 January 1784: William Smith
28 October 1803: Joseph Hunt
20 February 1806: Alexander Davison
7 April 1807: Joseph Hunt
30 January 1810: Thomas Alcock
20 June 1818: William Holmes
31 January 1831: Thomas Creevey
12 January 1835: Alexander Perceval
9 May 1835: Sir Henry Parnell, Bt

References
http://www.history.ac.uk/office/ordnance.html

Senior appointments of the British Army